Chalcolepidius zonatus is a species of beetles in the family Elateridae.

Description

Distribution
This species occurs in Argentina, Brazil, Guyana, Bolivia and Colombia.

References 
 Biolib
 Elateridae de Argentina
 Sônia Aparecida Casari  Review of the genus Chalcolepidius Eschscholtz, 1829 (Coleoptera, Elateridae, Agrypninae)

zonatus
Beetles described in 1829